David Talbot (born September 22, 1951) is an American journalist, author, activist and independent historian. Talbot is known for his books about the "hidden history" of U.S. power and the  liberal movements to change America, as well as his public advocacy. He was also the founder and former editor-in-chief of the pioneering web magazine, Salon.

Talbot founded Salon in 1995. The magazine gained a large following and broke several major national stories.

Since leaving Salon, Talbot has researched and written on the Kennedy assassination and other areas of what he calls "hidden history." Talbot has worked as a senior editor for Mother Jones magazine and a features editor for The San Francisco Examiner, and has written for Time magazine, The New Yorker, Rolling Stone, and other publications.

In addition to his work as an independent historian, Talbot has been deeply engaged in political activism, especially in his hometown, San Francisco, where he has campaigned for many progressive candidates and has been called "a leader in the fight to keep San Francisco affordable." On his blog, TheDavidTalbotShow.com, Talbot offers frequent opinions on burning national and local topics.

Early life and career
Talbot was born and raised in Los Angeles, California. His father was actor Lyle Talbot. He attended the Harvard School for Boys  but did not graduate after falling afoul of the school's headmaster and ROTC program during the Vietnam War. After graduating from the University of California at Santa Cruz, the only university that would accept him, he returned to Los Angeles, where he co-wrote with Barbara Zheutlin a history of the Hollywood Left, "Creative Differences", and freelanced for Crawdaddy, Rolling Stone, and other magazines. He later was hired by Environmental Action Foundation in Washington, D.C. to write "Power and Light," a book about the politics of energy. After he returned to California, he worked as an editor at Mother Jones magazine before San Francisco Examiner publisher Will Hearst hired him to edit the newspaper's Sunday magazine, Image. It was at the Examiner where Talbot developed the idea for Salon, convincing several of his newspaper colleagues to join him.

Salon
Salon is a web magazine based in San Francisco. Talbot has characterized Salon as aiming to be a "smart tabloid." In 1996, Time magazine picked Salon as the web site of the year. Originally created to cover books and popular culture, the web site became increasingly politicized during the Clinton impeachment drama in the late 1990s. Salon broke from the mainstream press by defending the Clinton presidency and investigating the right-wing prosecutorial apparatus headed by Kenneth Starr and Rep. Henry Hyde, whose own infidelity Salon exposed.

Before stepping down as Salon'''s CEO and editor-in-chief in 2005, Talbot stabilized the financially rocky web enterprise.
Talbot returned briefly as Salon CEO in 2011 but has since left the company.

Brothers: The Hidden History of the Kennedy Years
After leaving Salon, Talbot resumed his career as an author of popular history books. Talbot's book, The New York Times bestseller, Brothers: The Hidden History of the Kennedy Years, offers a potentially controversial view of the Kennedy presidency and assassination, and explores Bobby Kennedy's search for the truth about his brother's murder. Talbot is now working on a feature documentary based on Brothers.

Devil Dog
Talbot's book Devil Dog: The Amazing True Story of the Man Who Saved America chronicles the life and exploits of antiwar U.S. Marine General Smedley Darlington Butler. The book, which was part of an illustrated history series called Pulp History, is a collaboration with Zap Comix artist Spain Rodriguez. It focuses on the true story of General Smedley Butler, who fought in imperial wars all around the globe as a self-described "gangster for capitalism" before finally returning home where, during the Franklin Delano Roosevelt presidency, he finally got to truly defend democracy. Butler "saved America," in the words of the book, by thwarting an attempted Wall Street coup against FDR. Devil Dog, which was published by Simon & Schuster in fall 2010, won praise from The New York Times, which called the Pulp History series "rip-roaring nonfiction tales with enough purple prose, gory illustrations and va-va-va-voom women to lure in even reluctant teenage male readers".

Season of the Witch
Talbot's book Season of the Witch: Enchantment, Terror, and Deliverance in the City of Love, about the wild and bloody birth of "San Francisco values", was published in spring 2012. Season of the Witch received starred reviews in Publishers Weekly and Kirkus Reviews, and was described as "enthralling, news-driven history" (San Francisco Chronicle), "energetic, highly entertaining storytelling" (Boston Globe), and "an enthralling – and harrowing – account of how the 1967 Summer of Love gave way to 20 or so winters of discontent" (Washington Post).

The Devil's Chessboard

Talbot's book The Devil's Chessboard: Allen Dulles, the CIA, and the Rise of America's Secret Government is a biography examining the career of Allen Dulles.
According to Talbot, Dulles orchestrated the assassination of Kennedy at the behest of corporate leaders who perceived the President to be a threat to national security, lobbied Lyndon B. Johnson to have himself appointed to the Warren Commission, then arranged to have Lee Harvey Oswald take sole responsibility for the act. The book charges that the conspirators in JFK's death also murdered Bobby Kennedy as they perceived him to be "a wild card, an uncontrollable threat" that would reveal the plot.

The book has stirred debate about the history of the CIA. In a review for the San Francisco Chronicle, Glenn C. Altschuler stated, "Talbot’s indictment is long, varied and sensational." Altschuler wrote: "Animated by conspiracy theories, the speculations and accusations in his book often run far ahead of the evidence, even for those of us inclined to believe the worst about Allen Dulles."

But the book was praised elsewhere, including Kirkus Reviews, whose starred review, called it "a frightening biography of power, manipulation and outright treason. [...] all engaged American citizens should read this book and have their eyes opened."

 Between Heaven and Hell: The Story of My Stroke 

In November 2017, Talbot suffered an ischemic stroke. In January 2020, his book about the stroke and his recovery from it, Between Heaven and Hell: The Story of My Stroke, was published.

 By the Light of Burning Dreams: The Triumphs and Tragedies of the Second American Revolution 

In his latest book—co-authored with sister Margaret Talbot and brother-in-law Arthur Allen – Talbot examines transformational periods in the lives of radical leaders of the 1960s and ‘70s. The book, Talbot says, is “my final historical effort at understanding what my generation achieved, and what we failed to accomplish, in attempting to move the country fully toward its better angels.”

The book has been widely praised, including as an inspirational guide for a new generation of activists. Jessica Bruder, author of Nomadland, declared, “By the Light of Burning Dreams crackles with the radical energy of the 1960s and 70s. It’s a shot in the arm of bold idealism, an indispensable companion for today’s revolutionaries that reminds us what can happen if we dare to believe in – and fight for – a better world." And a critic in Kirkus Reviews celebrated the authors’ “sharp reporting and good storytelling…. (They) devote a chapter to each of seven flashpoints of the 1960s and ’70s that created ‘the second American Revolution.’ But an abundance of fresh material gives this book an intergenerational appeal. An intelligent and sympathetic reappraisal of the political upheavals of the ’60s and ’70s.”

Personal life
Talbot is from a media and entertainment family. He is the son of longtime character actor and founding member of the Screen Actors Guild, Lyle Talbot, and brother of documentary producer and former child actor Stephen Talbot, of physician Cynthia Talbot of Portland, Oregon, and of journalist Margaret Talbot, a staff writer at The New Yorker. Talbot is married to writer Camille Peri, co-editor of the national bestseller Mothers Who Think, with whom he has two children. His son Joe Talbot wrote and directed the 2019 film The Last Black Man in San Francisco.

David Talbot's sister, Margaret, has written a biography of their father, Lyle Talbot, and a memoir of their family life, The Entertainer: Movies, Magic and My Father's Twentieth Century'' (Riverhead Books, 2012).

References

External links
 Excerpt from “Brothers”, Salon, May 2, 2007
 Interview with David Talbot, Tavis Smiley Show, May 23, 2007
 Interview with David Talbot, Fresh Air, NPR, May 24, 2007
 Terry Gross interview with David Talbot, June 14, 2000
 The Talbot Players web site
 Leah Garchik column items on The Talbot Players in San Francisco Chronicle: November 10, 2009, September 8, 2008
 Slate review of "Devil Dog", December 10, 2010

20th-century American journalists
American male journalists
21st-century American journalists
21st-century American biographers
21st-century American historians
21st-century American male writers
Historians of the United States
Historians of the Central Intelligence Agency
American online journalists
Salon (website) people
American magazine founders
American online publication editors
American chief executives in the media industry
21st-century American memoirists
Historians from California
Writers from San Francisco
Activists from San Francisco
University of California, Santa Cruz alumni
Harvard-Westlake School alumni
1951 births
Living people
American male non-fiction writers